Metro Daily was the Hong Kong edition of Metro, which publishes free newspapers around the world with 25 editions in 16 countries in 14 languages. It was the first free newspaper in Hong Kong.

The Hong Kong version was first launched on 15 April 2002; it is distributed for free in the racks located in 49 Mass Transit Railway (MTR) stations except the Airport Station.

According to the Hong Kong Audit Bureau of Circulations in September 2002, the daily circulation of the newspaper was 302,197 copies, making it the third largest daily newspaper in Hong Kong. The paper is distributed from Monday to Friday (except for public holidays), by hand or from the newspaper stands in 49 MTR stations and 11 other key central locations, such as big shopping malls owned by MTR Corporation Limited like Paradise Mall, Telford Plaza, and Luk Yeung Galleria.

Though around one tenth size of other newspapers printing local first-hand news reported by fresh journalists, its main news sources are actually the television, radio news, press releases and wired news.
The paper is in Chinese in most parts, together with an English international section.  Although the paper is a tabloid, i.e. a minute-sized newspaper giving the stories in a condensed form, it includes many sections, which make the paper very rich in contents.
These sections include:
local news (including one page written in Simplified Chinese);
Chinese news;
international news;
finance;
sports;
entertainment;
side stories;
English news digest;
editorial column;
television program schedule; and
film section.

Readers can read the on-line edition of Metro all over the world by simply registering as users at its official site, and it is totally free. Besides, there is also a club called "Club Metro" offering discounts in films, sports and travel to its members.

See also
 Headline Daily
 am730
 Metro International
 Media in Hong Kong
 Newspapers of Hong Kong
 Free daily newspaper

References

External links
 

Chinese-language newspapers published in Hong Kong
Free daily newspapers
Publications established in 2002
2002 establishments in Hong Kong

zh:都市日報